Ambt Hardenberg is a former municipality in the Dutch province of Overijssel. It consisted of the countryside surrounding the city of Hardenberg, which was a separate municipality.

Ambt Hardenberg existed from 1818 to 1941, when it became a part of Hardenberg.

See also
Stad Hardenberg

References

Former municipalities of Overijssel
Hardenberg